L'Oiseau Blanc (English: The White Bird) was a French Levasseur PL.8 biplane that disappeared in 1927 during an attempt to make the first non-stop transatlantic flight between Paris and New York City to compete for the Orteig Prize. French World War I aviation heroes Charles Nungesser (third highest French ace with 43 air combat victories during World War I) and François Coli took off from Paris on 8 May 1927 and were last seen over Ireland. Less than two weeks later, Charles Lindbergh successfully made the New York–Paris journey and claimed the prize in the Spirit of St. Louis.

The disappearance of L'Oiseau Blanc is considered one of the great mysteries in the history of aviation. Many rumors circulated about the fate of the aircraft and crew, with mainstream opinion at the time being that it was probably lost in a squall over the Atlantic. Investigations starting in the 1980s suggest that it probably reached Newfoundland and may have crashed in Maine.

The disappearance of Nungesser and Coli has an extensive legacy and is referred to in many films and museums. A street in Paris is named after them and a commemorative postage stamp was issued in 1967. A statue at the Paris Le Bourget Airport honors the flight and there is a memorial on the cliffs of Étretat, where their aircraft was last seen in France.

Background
In 1919, New York hotel owner Raymond Orteig offered the $25,000 Orteig Prize (approximately ) to the first aviators to make a non-stop transatlantic flight between New York and Paris in the next five years. No one won the prize, so he renewed the offer in 1924. At that point, aviation technology was more advanced and many people were working toward winning it. Most were attempting to fly from New York to Paris, but a number of French aviators planned to fly from Paris to New York.

François Coli, age 45, was a World War I veteran and recipient of the French Legion of Honor, who had been making record-breaking flights around the Mediterranean Sea. He also had been planning a transatlantic flight since 1923. His original plans were to fly with his wartime comrade Paul Tarascon, a flying ace with 12 victories from the war. They became interested in the Orteig Prize in 1925, but in late 1926, an accident destroyed their Potez 25 biplane. Tarascon was badly burned and relinquished his place as pilot to 35-year-old Charles Nungesser, a highly experienced flying ace with over 40 victories, third highest among the French. He had been planning a solo crossing to win the Orteig Prize, but designer Pierre Levasseur insisted that he consider Coli as his navigator in a new two-place variant of the Levasseur PL.4.

Design and development
At the Pierre Levasseur Company in Paris, Nungesser and Coli, working closely with Chief Engineer Émile Farret and production manager Albert Longelot, assisted in the design of the new Levasseur PL.8 biplane. Based on the Levasseur PL.4 developed for the Aéronavale to operate from the French aircraft carrier Béarn, the PL.8 was a conventional, single-bay, wood and fabric-covered biplane that carried a crew of two in a side-by-side, open cockpit.

Major modifications included the reinforcement of the plywood fuselage, and removing two of the forward cockpits so the main cockpit could be widened to allow Nungesser and Coli to sit side by side.

The PL.8 also incorporated several safety features in case of ditching at sea. Apart from small floats attached directly to the undersides of the lower wing, the main units of the fixed, tailskid undercarriage could be jettisoned on takeoff, in order to reduce the aircraft's weight. The underside of the fuselage was given a boat-like shape and made watertight for a water landing. Nungesser and Coli's plan was to make a water landing in New York, in front of the Statue of Liberty.

A single W-12 Lorraine-Dietrich  engine was used, with the cylinders set in three banks angled 60° apart from one another, similar to the arrangement used in Napier engines. The engine was tested to ensure it would last the entire flight, and was run for over 40 hours while still in the Parisian factory.

The aircraft, christened L'Oiseau Blanc, was painted white, and had the French tricolor markings, with Nungesser's personal World War I flying ace logo: a skull and crossbones, candles and a coffin, on a black heart, painted on the fuselage. The biplane carried no radio and relied only on celestial navigation, a specialty of Coli from his previous flights around the Mediterranean.

In 1928, a second PL-8, and equipped with a Hispano-Suiza 12M, 375 kW (500 hp) engine, was built.

Operational history
In April 1927, the PL.8-01 was shipped from the factory for Nungesser to begin a series of proving tests to determine aircraft performance. Most of the flights were conducted around Villacoublay and Chartres.

The evaluations proceeded successfully through the flight envelope without major changes required to the basic design. The only incident of note was a fire that broke out in the hangar where the PL.8-01 had been stored. Scorched fabric on the top wing was the result with effective repairs carried out shortly after. On 7 May 1927, after the tests were complete, the aircraft was prepared for its record flight, flying from Villacoublay to Le Bourget Field.

Transatlantic attempt
Nungesser and Coli took off at 5:17 am, 8 May 1927 from Le Bourget Field in Paris, heading for New York. Gathering an escort of French fighter aircraft, Nungesser and Coli turned back as planned, and at low altitude, immediately jettisoned the main undercarriage.

The intended flight path was a great circle route, which would have taken them across the English Channel, over the southwestern part of England and Ireland, across the Atlantic to Newfoundland, then south over Nova Scotia, to Boston, and finally to a water landing in New York.

Once in the air, the biplane was escorted to the French coast by four military aircraft led by French Air Force Captain Venson, and sighted from the coastal town of Étretat. A sighting was made by the commanding officer of the British submarine , who recorded the note in his log, that he observed a biplane at 300 m altitude, 20 nautical miles southwest of the tip of Needles on the Isle of Wight. In Ireland, an aircraft overhead was reported by a resident of the town of Dungarvan and a Catholic priest reported a sighting over the village of Carrigaholt, then no further verified reports were made.

Crowds of people gathered in New York to witness the historic arrival, with tens of thousands of people crowding Battery Park in Manhattan to have a good view of the Statue of Liberty, where the aircraft was scheduled to touch down. Rumors circulated that L'Oiseau Blanc had been sighted along its route, in Newfoundland, or over Long Island. In France, some newspapers even reported that Nungesser and Coli had arrived safely in New York, evoking a wave of French patriotism. L'Oiseau Blanc had been carrying a sizable load of fuel, which would have given them approximately 42 hours of flight time. After this time had passed, with no word as to the aircraft's fate, it was realized that the aircraft had been lost. In France, the public was scandalized by the newspapers such as La Presse which had printed false reports about the aircraft's arrival, and outrage was generated against the companies involved, with demonstrations in the streets.

In the immediate aftermath of their disappearance, an international search was launched to find Nungesser and Coli. Aviation Digest sponsored a well-known pilot, Floyd Bennett, to search the area between New York and Newfoundland for nine days. The Canadian government search and rescue organizations also sent out two search aircraft (one of which crashed). Searchers including the French Navy, the United States Navy, and the Royal Canadian Navy scoured the route, including Labrador, the northeast coast of the U.S. and the area around the St. Lawrence River. With no sign of the aircraft, further search efforts were abandoned.

Twelve days after Nungesser and Coli's departure, Charles Lindbergh, flying solo in the Spirit of Saint Louis, took off from New York on his own famous journey. After a flight of 33 hours, 30 minutes, he received a hero's welcome when he arrived in Paris, even as the French mourned the loss of Nungesser and Coli.

Mystery
The mainstream view was that L'Oiseau Blanc crashed over the Atlantic due to a squall. Nonetheless, 12 witnesses in Newfoundland and Maine claimed to have heard the aircraft as it passed overhead. Residents at Harbour Grace, Newfoundland, reported sighting a white aircraft circling in haze or fog late on 9 May 1927. There were no aircraft on the island and no overflights taking place, and the local newspapers highlighted a "mystery" aircraft. If these sightings were of L'Oiseau Blanc, it would indicate that the flight was far behind schedule, as they would have been in the 40th hour of flight. This delay could be explained, however, by the fact that the aircraft was flying against the prevailing weather pattern. Fishermen off the coast of Newfoundland reported that the weather had turned cold and foul, which might have caused the delay. In May 1927, the US Coast Guard found an airplane wing in Napeague Bay at Fort Pond Bay, Long Island Sound; aircraft wreckage was seen in August 1927, 200 miles off the New York Coast.

There were many rumors concerning the aircraft's disappearance, including a theory that the aviators had been shot down by rum-runners aboard the rum boat Amistad
as well as the belief that Nungesser and Coli were living with indigenous peoples in Canada. In 1930, claims circulated that L'Oiseau Blancs engine had been located in Maine, but nothing was confirmed. Stories emerged in 1948 from reports that caribou hunters and fur trappers had found aircraft wreckage in Great Gull Pond in Newfoundland.

Gunnar Hansen's article "The Unfinished Flight of the White Bird" in the June 1980 issue of Yankee Magazine renewed popular interest in L'Oiseau Blanc. He described Anson Berry (d. 1936), a hermit living near Machias, Maine who heard a sputtering aircraft fly over his isolated camp at Round Lake late in the afternoon of 9 May 1927. Berry had not been able to see the aircraft because of fog and low clouds, but he heard a crash or forced landing in the distance. He tried to locate the crash site but was unsuccessful. Hansen and others researched the mystery during the 1980s and located multiple witnesses who reported memories of the aircraft in a line from Nova Scotia down to eastern Maine.

In 1984, the French government made an official investigation, concluding that it was possible that the aircraft had reached Newfoundland. In 1989, the NBC television series Unsolved Mysteries advanced the theory that the two aviators made it across the ocean but crashed and perished in the woods of Maine. Nungesser's relative William Nungesser made several trips to Maine to search, focusing his energies around the north slope of Round Lake Hills in Washington County as well as the area around Lake Winnipesaukee.

Clive Cussler and his NUMA organization also attempted to solve the mystery, searching for the aircraft in Maine and in Newfoundland. They made multiple visits in the 1980s and interviewed hunters, fishermen, and others who said that they had seen or heard the aircraft pass by in 1927. The NUMA expedition was named "Midnight Ghost" after Lindbergh's comment in The Spirit of St. Louis that Nungesser and Coli had "vanished like midnight ghosts". In 1992, divers traveled to Newfoundland and searched Great Gull Pond for a wreck, but they found nothing and were not even sure that they had located the right lake. Other lakes were also searched, from Machias to Chesterfield.

Certain pieces were found which did suggest that L'Oiseau Blanc had made it to the continent. Little of the aircraft would have remained, since it was created primarily from plywood and canvas. The parts most likely to endure would have been the engine and the aluminum fuel tanks. In Maine, bits and pieces of struts were found, and wood similar to the kind used to build the biplane. Engine metal was also found near the town of Machias that was not typical to the United States or Canada. Two residents described a large metal object, a "really big motor", which had been dragged out of the woods for salvage along a logging path. In 2011, the Wall Street Journal reported that an unofficial French team was focusing on theories that the aircraft crashed off the coast of Canada after flying over Newfoundland.

In 2022 Josh Gates along with some experts from the archeology department in St. John’s, Newfoundland went out  to Gull lake and found pieces of wreckage in the water of some sort of circular lid type metal and some wire that was the correct time frame material for the supposed flight. The team hypothesized that the biplane was running low on fuel as the calculations were off and the pilots trying to find water to land on chose gull lake but did not account for a large rocky island in the middle of the lake. They believe the plane hit the island and exploded blasting debris towards the deeper parts of the lake. The bodies of the pilots may be  in the lake still. This flight path is backed by several sworn eyewitness accounts and a mention of three explosions likely the fuel tanks did explode.

Legacy
The disappearance of L'Oiseau Blanc has been called "the Everest of aviation mysteries". TIGHAR, The International Group for Historic Aircraft Recovery, has called the aircraft, "History's Most Important Missing Airplane". It has been claimed that if the aircraft had successfully completed its journey, Lindbergh would not qualify for the Orteig Prize. When Lindbergh did succeed with his own flight across the Atlantic, the international attention on his achievement was possibly enhanced because of the disappearance of 'L'Oiseau Blanc just days earlier. It is also suggested that it was Lindbergh's historic success which gave a major boost to the American aviation industry, without which the course of America's military and industrial accomplishments might have been quite different.

A monument was erected in Étretat in 1927, to mark the last place from which the biplane was seen in France, but it was destroyed in 1942 by the occupying German army. There is also a nearby museum.
Another monument in France was inaugurated on 8 May 1928, at Le Bourget airport. Honoring Lindbergh, Nungesser and Coli, it is inscribed: "A ceux qui tentèrent et celui qui accomplit" (trans.: "To those who tried and to the one who succeeded"). The French issued a commemorative postage stamp in 1967, 40 years after the flight, to honor Nungesser and Coli's attempt. A street, Rue Nungesser et Coli, is named after the aviators, along the Stade Jean Bouin in the 16th arrondissement of Paris.

In 1928, the Ontario Surveyor General named a number of lakes in the northwest of the province to honour aviators who had perished during 1927, mainly in attempting oceanic flights. Amongst these are Coli Lake and Nungesser Lake.

The fate of L'Oiseau Blanc is occasionally mentioned in literature and films. The 1999 made-for-TV Canadian film Restless Spirits, a children's film with the alternate title Dead Aviators, uses the mystery of Nungesser and Coli's disappearance as the key plot device. A young girl, who struggles with her pilot father's death in an aircraft crash years before, visits her grandmother in Newfoundland. While there, she encounters the ghosts of Nungesser and Coli, whose restless spirits constantly relive their own unheralded 1927 crash in a nearby pond. The girl decides to help the pair move on to the afterlife by assisting them in rebuilding their aircraft and completing their flight so they may be released and, by doing so, works through her own emotional distress over her father's test flight death. In the opening montage of the 2005 film Sahara, based on Cussler's novel, a French newspaper article is displayed reporting a fictional story of NUMA finding the aircraft. And in the 2018 novel Chance to Break by Owen Prell, the protagonist muses about the fate of the French aviators and compares them to valiant athletes who are defeated in the arena of sports.

As of 2008, the landing gear (or, more accurately, "takeoff gear," since there was no intention to land on it) is the only confirmed part of the biplane remaining, and is on display at the Musée de l'Air et de l'Espace (French Air and Space Museum), in Le Bourget airport in Paris, the location from which L'Oiseau Blanc took off.

Specifications

See also 

 Aviation history
 List of missing aircraft
 Transatlantic flight

Notes

References

Citations

Sources

 Berg, A. Scott. Lindbergh. New York: G.P. Putnam's Sons, 1999, First edition 1998. .
 Jackson, Joe. Atlantic Fever: Lindbergh, His Competitors, and the Race to Cross the Atlantic. New York: Farrar, Straus and Giroux, 2012. .
 McDonaugh, Kenneth. Atlantic Wings 1919–1939: The Conquest of the North Atlantic by Aeroplane. Hemel Hempstead, Herts, UK: Model Aeronautical Press, 1966. .
 Montague, Richard. Oceans, Poles and Airmen: The First Flights Over Wide Waters and Desolate Ice. New York: Random House, 1971. .
 Mosley, Leonard. Lindbergh: A Biography (Dover Transportation). Mineola, NY: Courier Dover Publications, 2000. .
 Stoff, Joshua. Transatlantic Flight: A Picture History, 1873–1939. Mineoloa, NY: Dover publications, Inc., 2000. .
 Will, Gavin. The Big Hop: The North Atlantic Air Race. Portugal Cove-St. Phillips, Newfoundland: Boulder Publications, 2008. .
 Wohl, Robert. The Spectacle of Flight: Aviation and the Western Imagination, 1920–1950. New Haven, Conn.: Yale University Press, 2007, First edition 2005. .

External links

 L'Oiseau Blanc ("The White Bird"), check-six.com
 Picture of landing gear of L'Oiseau Blanc at the French Air and Space Museum
 French flying aces 'beat Charles Lindbergh's record' by Henry Samuel, telegraph.co.uk
 "Charles Lindbergh Won the Prize, but Did His Rival Get There First?" by Sebastian Moffett, Wall Street Journal

1927 in aviation
Individual aircraft
Missing aircraft
Transatlantic flight
Single-engined tractor aircraft
Biplanes
Aircraft first flown in 1927